Let It Shine may refer to:

 "Let It Shine" (Agnetha Fältskog song)
 Let It Shine (album), by Jeremy Fisher, or the title song
 Let It Shine (2007 TV series), a Singaporean Chinese drama 
 Let It Shine (2017 TV series), British reality television music competition
 Let It Shine (film), a 2012 Disney Channel Original Movie
 "Let It Shine" (Linda Hargrove song), also recorded by Olivia Newton-John
 "Let It Shine", song from Brian Wilson's 1988 album Brian Wilson
 "Let It Shine on Me", an alternative title for the song "Let Your Light Shine on Me"